Maxtor was an American computer hard disk drive manufacturer. Founded in 1982, it was the third largest hard disk drive manufacturer in the world before being purchased by Seagate in 2006.

History

Overview 
In 1981, three former IBM employees began searching for funding, and Maxtor was founded the following year. In 1983, Maxtor shipped its first product, the Maxtor XT-1140. In 1985, Maxtor filed its initial public offering and started trading on the New York Stock Exchange as "MXO." Maxtor bought hard drive manufacturer MiniScribe in 1990. Maxtor was getting close to bankruptcy in 1992 and closed its engineering operations in San Jose, California, in 1993. In 1996, Maxtor introduced its DiamondMax line of hard drives with DSP-based architecture. In 2000, Maxtor acquired Quantum's hard drive division, which gave Maxtor the ATA/133 hard drive interface and helped Maxtor revive its server hard drive market. In 2006, Maxtor was acquired by Seagate.

Early financing 

The Maxtor founders, James McCoy, Jack Swartz, and Raymond Niedzwiecki—graduates of the San Jose State University School of Engineering and former employees of IBM—began the search for funding in 1981. In early 1982, B.J. Cassin and Chuck Hazel (Bay Partners) provided the initial $3 million funding and the company officially began operations on July 1, 1982. In February 1983, it shipped its first product to Convergent Technology and immediately received an additional $5.5 million in its second round of funding. The company also began negotiations with the EDB (Economic Development Board) of Singapore for favorable terms before committing to Singapore as its offshore manufacturing location. The DBS (Development Bank of Singapore) agreed to provide financing to help grow the company in Singapore. In 1983, the company established a liaison and procurement office in Tokyo, headed by Tatsuya Yamamoto.

Maxtor's product architecture used eight disks; 15 surfaces recorded data and the final surface was where the servo track information was located. The company developed its own spindle motor, which was fitted within the casting containing the disks. This was a major departure as the spindle motor was usually mounted external to the disks. The first product was designed to provide 190 MB of storage, but delays in getting magnetic heads to the Maxtor design resulted in the company taking what was available, and the first drive—the XT-1140—was shipped with a capacity of only 140 MB. The company received an additional round of financing of approximately $37 million in 1984 before going public in 1985, with Goldman Sachs as the prime underwriter.

MiniScribe acquisition 
In 1990, Maxtor entered the mass market with its purchase of the assets (but not the liabilities) of bankrupt MiniScribe in Longmont, Colorado. The transition was a tough one as the early products of this union (notably the 7120AT 3.5-inch 120 MB drive) had many quality and design problems. Later products managed to sell well despite the initial problems. In 1996, the company completely redesigned its hard drive product line by introducing its DiamondMax series with a Texas Instruments digital signal processor.

Financial troubles 
After nine years of development, the original XT-series of drives had achieved a capacity of 1 GB. Maxtor sold the rights to the series to Sequel of Santa Clara, California in the mid-1990s, and the company exited the server drive market. Sequel, a spin-off of Unisys, was not a disk drive manufacturer; rather, they specialized in refurbishing drives for the existing customer base. Teetering on the brink of bankruptcy in 1992, Maxtor's exit from the high-capacity 5.25-inch SCSI market temporarily left a product void in the industry. Around this time, SCSI versions of the 7000 series drives were also discontinued, and all engineering operations in San Jose were shut down in late 1993, leaving only the former MiniScribe design engineering staff. After turnover in the executive staff, Maxtor decided it had made a mistake, and when Maxtor moved its headquarters to Milpitas, California, it gradually began to rebuild its engineering staff.

Acquisition of the Quantum hard drive division 
In late 2000, Maxtor acquired the hard drive business of Quantum. The merger, which was completed on April 1, 2001, made Maxtor larger than its rivals, notably Seagate, and returned it to the server hard drive market and also implemented the ATA/133 interface into its hard drives.

Focus on external drives 
Like many other hard drive manufacturers, Maxtor had been expanding in recent years into the external hard drive market. Its Maxtor One-Touch II external hard drive was marketed as convenient storage for the home user. Maxtor entered and became dominant in consumer business as result of a marketing strategy for the OneTouch line. The OneTouch is a high-capacity (500 GB to 1 TB) USB drive with a single-press button to back up and mirror the computer's hard drive. The line became the best-selling consumer device in the computer segment with several million devices distributed globally.

Maxtor had initially made efforts to get into the 2.5-inch hard drive market, but in the beginning of 2005, new management made the surprising decision to discontinue development in this field. This was considered by many industry watchers to be a particularly peculiar move, since the market for such hard drives (mainly notebook computers and MP3 players) was already experiencing rapid growth, with no signs of slowing down in the foreseeable future.

Acquisition by Seagate 
In a deal worth nearly US$2 billion, Maxtor was acquired by its rival Seagate in 2006. The Maxtor brand was revived by Seagate in later 2016, although the former Maxtor factory in Suzhou, China, was wound down in 2017.

Competitors 

 Adaptec
 Fabrik Inc.
 Hitachi Global Storage Technologies
 Iomega
 Samsung
 Western Digital

References

Seagate Technology
1982 establishments in California
2006 disestablishments in California
2006 mergers and acquisitions
Companies based in Milpitas, California
Computer companies established in 1982
Computer companies disestablished in 2006
Computer storage companies
Defunct companies based in the San Francisco Bay Area
Defunct computer companies based in California
Defunct computer companies of the United States
Defunct computer hardware companies
Manufacturing companies established in 1982
Manufacturing companies disestablished in 2006
Technology companies based in the San Francisco Bay Area
Technology companies established in 1982
Technology companies disestablished in 2006